This is a list of diplomatic missions in Dominica. The capital Roseau currently hosts 3 embassies. Several other countries have honorary consulates or non-resident ambassadors resident in other Caribbean capitals or elsewhere.

Embassies
Roseau

Honorary Consulates in Roseau

Accredited embassies

 (Caracas)
 (Kingston)
 (Port of Spain)
 (Bogotá)
 (Washington, D.C.)
 (Bridgetown)
 (Kingston)
 (Bridgetown)
 (Bridgetown)
 (Kingston)
 (Washington DC)
 (Port of Spain)
 (Washington DC)
 (Caracas)
 (Caracas)
 (Castries)
 (Port of Spain)
 (Port-of-Spain)
 (Washington DC)
 (Santo Domingo)
 (Georgetown)
 (Caracas)
 (New York City)
 (Havana)
 (Santo Domingo)
 (Caracas)
 (Port of Spain)
 (Washington, D.C.)
 (Caracas)
 (Washington, D.C.)
 (Washington D.C.)
 (Havana)
 (Castries)
 (Washington, D.C.)
 (New York City)
 (Caracas)
 (Castries)
 (Castries)
 (Port of Spain)
 (Bogota)
 (Bridgetown)
 (Washington, D.C.)
 (Bogotá)
 (Bogotá)
 (Kingston)
 (Washington, D.C.)
 (Caracas)
 (Havana)
 (Washington D.C.)
 (Kingston)
 (Santo Domingo)
 (Kingston)
 (Stockholm)
 (Santo Domingo)
 (Caracas)
 (Caracas)
 (Washington D.C.)
 (Ottawa)
 (Washington D.C.)
 (Basseterre)
 (Santo Domingo)
 (Washington D.C.)
 (Washington D.C.)
 (Bogota)
 (Bridgetown)
 (Bridgetown)
 (Caracas)
 (Washington D.C.)
 (Caracas)
 (Havana)
 (Washington D.C.)
 (Ottawa)

See also
Foreign relations of Dominica
List of diplomatic missions of Dominica

References

Dominica
Foreign relations of Dominica
Diplomatic missions